Hongŭi station is a railway station in Hongŭi-ri, Sŏnbong county, Rasŏn Special City, North Korea; it is the junction point of the Hongŭi and Hambuk lines of the Korean State Railway.

History
The station was opened by the Chosen Government Railway on 16 November 1929, along with the rest of the Unggi–Sinasan section of the East Tomun Line – the first section of that line to be laid.

In 2008, construction was started from Khasan, Russia to Rajin port, including modernisation of communications equipment and the conversion of the standard-gauge track to dual-gauge (standard and Russian gauges), to allow movement of trains from Russia to Rajin without stopping for bogie changes. Construction was completed in October 2012, and an opening ceremony was held on 22 September 2013.

Services

Freight
Tumangang station is the primary transit point for trade with Russia; all of this traffic passes through Hongŭi station. The main imports from Russia are timber and crude oil; the main exports are magnesite, steel, fertiliser, non-ferrous metals and non-ferrous metal concentrates, but since the collapse of the Soviet Union freight traffic has dropped significantly.

Passenger
The international express train 7/8 that operates between P'yŏngyang and Moscow runs on this line between Hongŭi and Tumangang before crossing the border into Russia. There is also a long-distance service between Tumangang and Tanch'ŏn Ch'ŏngnyŏn station on the P'yŏngra Line.

References

Railway stations in North Korea
Railway stations opened in 1929
Buildings and structures in Rason